Treffen in Travers is a 1988 German drama film directed by Michael Gwisdek. It was screened in the Un Certain Regard section at the 1989 Cannes Film Festival.

Cast
 Hermann Beyer as Georg Forster
 Corinna Harfouch as Therese Forster
 Uwe Kockisch as Ferdinand Huber
 Susanne Bormann as Röschen Forster
 Lucie Gebhardt as Klärchen Forster
 Astrid Krenz as Liese
 Peter Dommisch as Leonidas
 Heide Kipp as Marthe
 Wolf-Dietrich Köllner as Rougemont
 Andreas Schneider as Jean Claude
 Hark Bohm as Bürgermeister

References

External links

1988 films
East German films
1980s German-language films
1988 drama films
Films directed by Michael Gwisdek
Films set in Switzerland
Films set in the 1790s
German drama films
1980s German films